Alexander Johnston, CMG (April 24, 1867 – November 30, 1951) was a Canadian journalist, civil servant and politician.

Born in Richmond County, Nova Scotia, Johnston was educated at the Common Schools and St. Francis Xavier College, Antigonish, Nova Scotia. He was the editor and proprietor of the Sydney Daily Record. He was elected, in 1897, to the Nova Scotia House of Assembly but he resigned his seat in 1900 in order to contest the riding of Cape Breton for the House of Commons of Canada. A Liberal, he was successful and was re-elected in 1904. He was defeated in 1908. Johnston was Deputy Minister of Marine and Fisheries from 1910 to 1933. Johnston was made a Companion of the Order of St Michael and St George in 1935. He died in Ottawa at the age of 84.

References
 
 The Canadian Parliament; biographical sketches and photo-engravures of the senators and members of the House of Commons of Canada. Being the tenth Parliament, elected November 3, 1904
 A Directory of the Members of the Legislative Assembly of Nova Scotia, 1758-1958, Public Archives of Nova Scotia (1958)

1867 births
1951 deaths
Liberal Party of Canada MPs
Members of the House of Commons of Canada from Nova Scotia
Nova Scotia Liberal Party MLAs
Canadian Companions of the Order of St Michael and St George